Luis Pineda (born October 17, 1974) is a former Major League Baseball player who pitched for the Detroit Tigers and the Cincinnati Reds. He debuted on August 4, 2001, with the Tigers against the Oakland Athletics and had a perfect line of 1.0 IP, 0 H, 0 SO, 0 BB, 0 ER  for the night. After his rookie season he was traded by the Tigers with Juan Encarnación to the Reds for Dmitri Young. His last appearance was in 2002 for Cincinnati.

External links

1974 births
Living people
Cincinnati Reds players
Detroit Tigers players
Major League Baseball pitchers
Erie SeaWolves players
Gulf Coast Mets players
Gulf Coast Rangers players
Jacksonville Suns players
Lakeland Tigers players
Louisville Bats players
Norfolk Tides players
St. Lucie Mets players
Toledo Mud Hens players
West Michigan Whitecaps players
Dominican Republic expatriate baseball players in the United States
Major League Baseball players from the Dominican Republic